ZBB is a three-letter abbreviation with multiple meanings, as described below:

 Zero Bug Bounce, a measure of software quality assurance
 Zero-based budgeting, an alternative to traditional budget planning
 Zac Brown Band, a country music band founded out of the heart of Atlanta 
 Zompist Bulletin Board, a forum for constructed worlds and languages

ZBB may also be:
 the IATA code for the Esbjerg Rail Station operated by DSB in Esbjerg, Denmark
 part of CZBB, the ICAO code for Boundary Bay Airport in British Columbia, Canada
 the call sign of a 2 kW navigation beacon on 396 kHz that was located on South Bimini Island within the nation of The Bahamas.
 the postcode of Żebbuġ, Gozo, Malta